Maurizio Vandelli (born 9 August 1964 in Modena) is an Italian former cyclist.

Palmares

1985
1st Stage 11 Vuelta al Tachira
1987
3rd Giro del Veneto
1988
10th Overall Giro d'Italia
1990
1st Overall Ruota d'Oro
1st Stage 1
3rd Coppa Agostoni
1995
2nd Piccolo Giro di Lombardia
1996
1st Stage 1 Giro d'Abruzzo
1st Overall Giro della Valle d'Aosta
1st Stage 3
1997
1st Trofeo Salvatore Morucci
2nd Trofeo Banca Popolare di Vicenza
3rd Overall Giro d'Abruzzo
1998
1st Trofeo Salvatore Morucci
1999
1st Overall Uniqa Classic
1st Overall Tour of Austria
1st Stage 7
3rd Piccolo Giro di Lombardia
3rd Trofeo Gianfranco Bianchin
2000
1st Overall Uniqa Classic
1st Stage 7 Vuelta a Venezuela
3rd Overall Tour of Austria
2001
1st Overall Uniqa Classic
1st Stage 4
3rd Giro del Medio Brenta
2003
3rd Völkermarkter Radsporttage
2004
3rd Overall Tour of Austria
2005
2nd Raiffeisen Grand Prix

References

1964 births
Living people
Italian male cyclists
Sportspeople from Modena
Cyclists from Emilia-Romagna